Chaetocolea is a genus of liverworts belonging to the family Pseudolepicoleaceae.

The species of this genus are found in Southern America.

Species:
 Chaetocolea palmata Spruce

References

Jungermanniales
Jungermanniales genera